50 First Dates is a 2004 American romantic comedy drama film directed by Peter Segal and starring Adam Sandler and Drew Barrymore with Rob Schneider, Sean Astin and Dan Aykroyd in supporting roles. It follows the story of Henry, a womanizing marine veterinarian who falls for an art teacher named Lucy. When he discovers she has amnesia, and forgets him when she falls asleep, he resolves to win her over again each new day.

Most of the film was shot on location in Oahu, Hawaii, on the Windward side and the North Shore. Sandler and Barrymore won an MTV award for Best On Screen Team. The fictitious memory impairment suffered by Barrymore's character, "Goldfield's Syndrome", is similar to short-term memory loss and anterograde amnesia.

The film was remade in India as Sathyabhama (2007) (in Telugu) and as Ormayundo Ee Mukham (2014) (in Malayalam), in Japan as 50 First Kisses (2018), in Iran as Chap dast (2005) and in Mexico as Como si fuera la primera vez in 2019.

Plot
Henry Roth is a veterinarian at Sea Life Park Hawaii on Oahu with a policy of only dating visiting tourists to avoid any serious commitments. His closest friends are Ula, a marijuana-smoking Islander; Alexa, his androgynous assistant; Willy, his pet African penguin; and Jocko, a walrus that lives at the park.

One day, Henry's boat breaks down, so he goes to the Hukilau Café to wait for the Coast Guard. He sees Lucy Whitmore make architectural art with her waffles. Henry assumes she is a local, which prevents him from introducing himself. He tries to go back to womanizing tourists, but can't seem to get Lucy out of his head. The next day, he comes back and has breakfast with her. They instantly connect and Lucy asks to see him again the next morning.

The next day, however, Lucy shows no recollection of ever meeting him. The restaurant owner Sue explains to Henry that the year before, Lucy and her father Marlin went up to the North Shore to pick a pineapple for his birthday. On the way back, a cow wandered through a broken fence and onto the road, causing a car accident that left Lucy with anterograde amnesia. She remembers her life up until the night before the accident, but forgets any new experiences when she goes to sleep. To save her the heartbreak of reliving the accident, Marlin and Doug, Lucy's lisping steroid-addicted brother, re-enact Marlin's birthday every day.

Despite Sue's warning, Henry tries to get Lucy to have breakfast with him again. It ends poorly when Henry unintentionally hurts Lucy's feelings, and he follows her home to apologize. At her house, Marlin and Doug instruct Henry to leave Lucy alone, but Alexa advises Henry to look for a loophole in said instruction. Realizing that Marlin specifically said to stay away from the café, Henry begins concocting ways to run into Lucy on the road through the following days, during which he manages to successfully impress her over a series of "first" dates and "chance" encounters. Later, Marlin and Doug give their permission for Henry to continue when they discover Lucy regularly singing the Beach Boys' "Wouldn't It Be Nice" in her painting studio – the first major change in her routine since the accident.

One day, as Henry is about to sit with Lucy at breakfast, she notices a police officer writing a ticket because of her expired plates. With the ruse exposed, Lucy is distressed to learn that her friends and family have maintained the charade for so long; however, in watching her reaction, Henry surmises that her strongest reactions are to feeling betrayed by her loved ones, not the actual memory loss.

Henry devises a new strategy to let Lucy know about the truth by creating a video with her friends to explain the situation calmly; rather than let her go through her pre-accident routine, they plant the video in her room with a note to play it when she first wakes up. The strategy works and allows Lucy to process the events while catching her up on current events, including her relationship to Henry. Henry and Lucy's relationship grows well using this method, and they continue to refine the process while enduring some humorous setbacks, such as their sleeping together and Lucy attacking Henry the next morning. However, when Lucy discovers that Henry has decided to cancel ten years' worth of planning for his research study of walruses in Bristol Bay to help manage her condition, she decides that they need to break up. Henry reluctantly helps her destroy her journal entries of their relationship and effectively "erase" their time together.

Some weeks later, Henry is preparing to leave for his research study. Before he goes, Marlin tells him that Lucy is now living at the institute and teaching an art class.  As a parting gift, he gives Henry a Beach Boys CD which reminds him of Lucy to the point of crying. Suddenly, he realizes that Lucy's singing of "Wouldn't It Be Nice" was not random, but occurred on days when they "met" and indicates new learned memory retention. Henry abandons his trip and rushes to the art class. While Lucy does not remember him, she reveals that she dreams about him every night and has been painting some of their adventures. Seeing this as a sign, they happily reconcile.

Some time later, Lucy wakes up and plays the tape marked "Good Morning Lucy". It again reminds her of her accident, but ends with her and Henry's wedding. From the tape, Henry says to put a jacket on and come have breakfast when she is ready. Lucy then sees that she is on Henry's boat, which finally made it to Alaska. She goes up on deck and meets Marlin, Henry and their young daughter, Nicole.

Cast
Adam Sandler as Henry Roth, a marine veterinarian with a habit of wooing women and a fear of commitment.
Drew Barrymore as Lucy Whitmore, Henry's love interest with short-term memory loss.
Rob Schneider as Ula, Henry's marijuana-smoking, wealthy native Hawaiian assistant and best friend; who is unhappily married to an overweight native woman and has five young, athletically talented children.
Sean Astin as Doug Whitmore, Lucy's older brother, a lisping, steroid-dependent bodybuilder.
Blake Clark as Marlin Whitmore, Lucy's widowed father, a professional fisherman.
Lusia Strus as Alexa, Henry's ambiguously gendered assistant.
Dan Aykroyd as Dr. Joseph Keats, a physician specializing in brain disorders.
Amy Hill as Sue, the Hukilau café manager and friend of Lucy and her late mother.
Pomaika'i Brown as Nick, the Hukilau café chef and Sue’s husband. 
Allen Covert as Ten-Second Tom, a hospital patient with severe memory impairment.
Missi Pyle as Noreen, a tax attorney Henry meets at a bar but then tries to fix up with Alexa.
Maya Rudolph as Stacy, pregnant friend of Lucy's at the beach party.
Lynn Collins as Linda
Kevin James as Factory worker

Production

On October 29, 2002, Variety reported that Columbia Pictures had bought a spec script from screenwriter George Wing, titled Fifty First Kisses, with Adam Sandler and Drew Barrymore originally in negotiations to star in the lead roles. Barrymore was sold on the script and wrote Sandler a letter suggesting it as their next film together since The Wedding Singer. Sandler joined the cast in December 2002, and was announced as co-producer under his film studio Happy Madison Productions along with Steve Golin's Anonymous Content. Sandler then recommended the script to director Peter Segal while they were working post-production on Anger Management. Segal agreed to direct, leaving him with only two days of break from work before filming. The director revealed that the studio had changed the original title to 50 First Dates because "marketing found that the term 'kisses' was turning off guys".

While the script is primarily credited to George Wing, Lowell Ganz, Babaloo Mandel, Tim Herlihy, and Allen Covert did uncredited rewrites on it as well. Adam Sandler had also reworked the script, significantly transforming its genre from drama to comedy. Additional changes Sandler made to the script include moving its setting from Seattle to Hawaii and rewriting a decent amount of interior scenes that takes place in a café. Director Peter Segal felt these scenes were "very claustrophobic" as well as derivative of My Dinner with Andre, encouraging Sandler to rewrite these and move the location to the Kualoa Ranch. Sandler said that shooting in Hawaii "just seemed like the very best possible place to do it for many different reasons. You don't see many movies [set] there, so it was a great experience to film in a different locale. And it is such a spectacularly beautiful place for a romantic comedy."

Most of the film was shot on location in Kaneohe, Kaaawa, Wahiawa, Makapuu, Waimānalo, and Honolulu, as well as in Kāneohe Bay in 2003. The Hukilau Cafe where Drew Barrymore and Adam Sandler had breakfast each morning is still standing at Kualoa Ranch, as well as the roadway and gate in the valley where they met each day. Due to the high cost of filming outside of the studio zone, some interior scenes (such as inside the Whitmore residence) were shot on sets in Los Angeles carefully decorated to look like they were in Hawaii.

Soundtrack

The soundtrack contains cover versions of songs that were originally recorded in the 1980s. This includes mostly reggae-style covers. It was a moderate commercial hit, reaching number 30 on the Billboard 200 and number 1 on the Top Soundtracks chart and Top Reggae Albums chart in the United States.

Despite being prominently featured in the film, neither the Beach Boys' 1966 "Wouldn't It Be Nice" nor Israel Kamakawiwoʻole's 1990 "Somewhere Over the Rainbow/What a Wonderful World" was included on the soundtrack.

The soundtrack was produced by 311's frontman, Nick Hexum. 311 provided a cover of the Cure's "Lovesong" for the soundtrack. It is heard over the film's end credits.

 Other songs in the film
 The Beach Boys – "Wouldn't It Be Nice"
 The Cure – "Boys Don't Cry"
 The Beat – "Hands Off She's Mine"
 The Flaming Lips – "Do You Realize??"
 Wyclef Jean – "Baby"
 Israel Kamakawiwoʻole – "Somewhere Over the Rainbow/What a Wonderful World" medley (Originally recorded by Judy Garland/Louis Armstrong)
 The Maile Serenaders – "My Sweet Sweet"
 The Makaha Sons of Ni'Ihau – "Aloha Ka Manini"
 Manfred Mann's Earth Band – "Blinded by the Light"
 Bob Marley and the Wailers – "Could You Be Loved" and "Is This Love"
 Paul McCartney and Linda McCartney – "Another Day"
 No Doubt – "Underneath It All"
 O-Shen – "Throw Away The Gun"
 Harve Presnell – "They Call the Wind Maria"
 Leon Redbone and Ringo Starr – "My Little Grass Shack in Kealakekua, Hawaii"
 Adam Sandler and Rob Schneider – "Ula's Luau Song"
 Snoop Dogg – "From tha Chuuuch to da Palace"
 311 – "Amber" and "Rub A Dub"
 Toots and the Maytals – "Pressure Drop"
 The Ventures – "Hawaii Five-O"
 Patty and Mildred Hill – "Happy Birthday to You"

Certifications

Critical reception 
On Rotten Tomatoes 50 First Dates has a score of 45% based on 175 reviews from critics, with an average rating of 5.4/10. The website's consensus states, "Gross-out humor overwhelms the easy chemistry between Adam Sandler and Drew Barrymore, who bring some energy and yucks to this tale of a girl with short-term memory loss and the guy who tries to get her to love him." On Metacritic, the film has a score of 48% based on 38 reviews, indicating "mixed or average reviews". Audiences surveyed by CinemaScore gave the film a grade A− on scale of A to F.

Critics who enjoyed the film (such as The New York Times reviewer A. O. Scott) praised the uplifting story while lamenting the seemingly excessive and incongruous amount of crude humor and drug references. Roger Ebert gave it three out of four stars, saying "The movie is sort of an experiment for Sandler. He reveals the warm side of his personality, and leaves behind the hostility, anger and gross-out humor... The movie doesn't have the complexity and depth of Groundhog Day... but as entertainment it's ingratiating and lovable." 
Rex Reed was more negative in his review for The New York Observer, calling the film "stupid, coarse and abysmally unfunny" while singling out offensive humor about brain damage.

Sandler and Barrymore won the award for Best On-Screen Team at the MTV Movie & TV Awards. The two actors, who had previously worked together in the film The Wedding Singer, are said to regard 50 First Dates as one of their favorite collaborations as professional "soul mates".

Depiction of amnesia
In an article in The BMJ on depictions of amnesia in film, clinical neuropsychologist Sallie Baxendale writes that 50 First Dates "maintains a venerable movie tradition of portraying an amnesic syndrome that bears no relation to any known neurological or psychiatric condition".

In 2010, researchers described a woman who developed a similar kind of memory impairment after she was involved in a car crash. She described her memory as being normal for events on the same day, with memories from the previous day subsequently being lost each night. However, a neuropsychological test revealed some improvement in recall for tasks which she had, unknowingly, performed the previous day. Although the woman claimed not to have seen 50 First Dates prior to her 2005 crash (but has watched it several times since), she stated that Drew Barrymore was her favorite actress, leading researchers to conclude that her condition might have been influenced by some knowledge of the film's plot, and its impact upon her understanding of amnesia.

In July 2015, two people were discovered to have a form of anterograde amnesia that resembles the type depicted in the movie. One is a man in the UK, originally from Germany. He wakes up every day thinking it is March 14, 2005, because that is the day he underwent anesthesia for a dental procedure which led to this condition as a rare, unexplained complication (however, his anterograde amnesia, like that of others with the condition, causes him to forget facts not daily, but within 90 minutes). The other is a woman who reportedly believes every day is October 15, 2014. She used to be a pub manager and was visiting Kettering General Hospital for a kickboxing injury when she slipped and hit her head on a metal pole.

Real world application
The Hebrew Home of Riverdale, Bronx, has started an experimental program in which residents with early dementia watch a video every morning in which they see comforting messages and reminders from family members that they may still know. After April 2015, the program may include more residents. Robert Abrams of NewYork–Presbyterian Hospital considered this idea "both innovative and thoughtful". Charlotte Dell, director of social services for the home, said the program was inspired by 50 First Dates.

References

External links

2004 films
2004 romantic comedy films
American romantic comedy films
American sex comedy films
2000s English-language films
Films directed by Peter Segal
Films about amnesia
2000s sex comedy films
Films scored by Teddy Castellucci
Films set in Hawaii
Films shot in Hawaii
Flower Films films
Happy Madison Productions films
Columbia Pictures films
Films produced by Jack Giarraputo
Films produced by Steve Golin
2000s American films